The 2022 Wyoming State Senate election was held as part of the biennial elections in the United States. Wyoming voters elected state senators in 16 of the 31 state Senate districts. State senators serve four-year terms in the Wyoming State Senate.

Predictions

Results summary

Summary of results by State Senate district

References

External links
 

Wyoming Senate
State Senate
Wyoming State Senate elections